Events from the year 1967 in Argentina.

Incumbents
 President: Juan Carlos Onganía
 Vice president: vacant

Governors
 Buenos Aires Province: Francisco A. Imaz
 Chubut Province: Rodolfo Varela then Osvaldo Guaita
 Mendoza Province: José Eugenio Blanco

Vice Governors
 Buenos Aires Province: vacant

Events

Births

Deaths
 19 October – Che Guevara, Marxist revolutionary (executed) (b. 1928)

See also

 1967 Argentine Primera División
 List of Argentine films of 1967

References

External links

 
Years of the 20th century in Argentina